Fuscopannaria dissecta is a species of corticolous (bark-dwelling),  in the family Pannariaceae. Found in Japan, it was formally described as a new species in 2000 by Norwegian lichenologist Per Magnus Jørgensen. The lichen has a pale brown thallus that forms irregular patches comprising squamules that about are about 2 mm wide. The squamules are dissected–cut deeply into fine lobes–and it is this character that is referenced in the species epithet dissecta.

References

dissecta
Lichen species
Lichens described in 2000
Lichens of Japan
Taxa named by Per Magnus Jørgensen